Craig Allen (born January 25, 1957, Brooklyn, New York) is a meteorologist whose weather reports can be heard weekdays on WCBS Newsradio 880 (880 AM radio) in New York City and globally on Audacy.com. He also does freelance forecasting for the News 12 Networks.

Allen previously worked for WCBS-TV until September 2006 including CBS This Morning from 1996-1999. He has also done part time work for WNYW-TV and was the weekend meteorologist at WPIX-TV from 2010 to 2020.

Allen is a graduate of Farmingdale High School. He earned his bachelor's degree from Stony Brook University in 1979 and has been the chief meteorologist on WCBS since 1981.

On April 27, 2021, Allen began his 40th year with WCBS-AM/880. He is now the longest running primary meteorologist on a radio station in the country according to CBS News, the New York Daily News and an interview with Jerry Barmash from the New York Examiner/Fish Bowl NY.

Allen also added additional radio duties for CBS Radio News, providing information, data and forecasts for the radio network.

He volunteers as the gardener for his local civic association and works with several non profit and charitable organizations including the Long Island chapter of Autism Speaks, Island Harvest and animal rescues

See also
 New Yorkers in journalism

References

1957 births
Living people
American meteorologists
CBS News people
Scientists from Brooklyn
Stony Brook University alumni
Farmingdale High School alumni